The 1992 Labatt Brier was held from March 8 to 15 at the Agridome in Regina, Saskatchewan.

Vic Peters of Manitoba defeated Russ Howard of Ontario in the final in an extra end to win his first and only Brier of his career.

Teams

Round-robin standings

Round-robin results

Draw 1

Draw 2

Draw 3

Draw 4

Draw 5

Draw 6

Draw 7

Draw 8

Draw 9

Draw 10

Draw 11

Draw 12

Draw 13

Draw 14

Draw 15

Draw 16

Draw 17

Playoffs

Semifinal

Final
March 15

Statistics

Top 5 player percentages
Round Robin only

Team percentages
Round Robin only

References

The Brier
Sports competitions in Regina, Saskatchewan
1992 in Canadian curling
Curling in Saskatchewan
Labatt Brier